The 1980–81 Roller Hockey Champions Cup was the 16th edition of the Roller Hockey Champions Cup organized by CERH.

Barcelona achieved their sixth title.

Teams
The champions of the main European leagues, and Barcelona as title holders, played this competition, consisting in a double-legged knockout tournament. As Barcelona qualified also as Spanish champion, Tordera joined also the competition.

Bracket

Source:

References

External links
 CERH website

1980 in roller hockey
1981 in roller hockey
Rink Hockey Euroleague